"War" is a song by American rapper King Von, released on March 2, 2022, as the third single from his second studio album What It Means to Be King (2022). The song was produced by Chopsquad DJ.

Background
King Von previewed the song in 2020 on Instagram Live, before his murder later that year. The song gained traction via the social platform TikTok as well. It was posthumously released on March 2, 2022. The song finds King Von rapping about his lifestyle on the streets, involving being ready and dealing with his enemies.

Charts

References

2022 singles
2022 songs
King Von songs
Empire Distribution singles